Karen Platt is a British gardening author and publisher, best known for the reference book Black Magic and Purple Passion. She started her writing career in 1996 by self-publishing her first book, The Seed Search. She has been on BBC television, KATU, HGTV and BBC Radio several times. Her publications have been recommended by Alan Titchmarsh and others. Since 2001, much of her work has involved popularizing black plants; she founded the International Black Plant Society in 2002. Platt also runs a nursery called Black Plant Nursery.

Works 

 Black Magic and Purple Passion, 2004, 
 Gold Fever, 2004, 
 Seed Sowing and Growing Success, 2003, 
 Silver Lining, 2005, 
 Plant Names A-Z, 1999, 
 Emeralds, 2005, 
 The Seed Search 5th edition, 2002, 
 Plant Synonyms, 2006 
 Lifestyle Gardening, 2007

References 

 Dusky, Not Dreary (The Seattle Times), Valerie Easton
 Black Plants (About.com), David Beaulieu

External links 
 Karen Platt's official website
 Karen Platt short bio

Living people
Writers from Sheffield
Year of birth missing (living people)
20th-century English women writers
20th-century English writers
21st-century English women writers